Amy is an unincorporated community in Jones County, Mississippi.

In 1900, Amy had a post office and a population of 27.

References

Unincorporated communities in Jones County, Mississippi
Unincorporated communities in Mississippi